The Ohio general elections, 2014 were held on November 4, 2014, throughout Ohio, with polls opened between 6:30AM and 7:30PM. The close of registration for electors in the primary election was April 7, 2014, and the primary election day took place on May 6, 2014.

Early voting
During the week of November 18, 2013, Republicans in the state legislature planned to introduce four bills that would restrict voting in the 2014 elections, including shortening the early voting period from thirty-five to twenty-nine days.

Federal representatives

United States Senate
There was no U.S. Senate election in Ohio in 2014. Republican Senator Rob Portman is a Class III Senator who ran for and won re-election in 2016. Democratic Senator Sherrod Brown is a Class I Senator who ran for and won re-election in 2018.

United States House of Representatives

All of Ohio's 16 seats in the United States House of Representatives were up for election in 2014.

State executive branch

Governor and Lieutenant Governor

Incumbent Republican Governor John Kasich and Lieutenant Governor Mary Taylor ran for re-election to a second term in office.

Ed FitzGerald, the County Executive of Cuyahoga County, Ohio, was the Democratic nominee. His running mate was attorney and former Congressional nominee Sharen Neuhardt.

Anita Rios ran as the Green Party candidate. Her running mate was Bob Fitrakis.

Governor John Kasich and his running mate Lt. Governor Mary Taylor were re-elected with 64% of the vote.

Attorney General

Incumbent Republican Attorney General Mike DeWine ran for re-election to a second term in office.

Former Cincinnati City Councilman and former Hamilton County Commissioner David A. Pepper ran for the Democrats.

General election

Polling

Results

Secretary of State

Incumbent Republican Secretary of State Jon Husted ran for re-election to a second term in office.

State Senator Nina Turner ran for the Democrats.

Libertarian Kevin Knedler also ran.

General election

Polling

Results

Treasurer

Incumbent Republican State Treasurer Josh Mandel ran for re-election to a second term in office.

State Representative Connie Pillich ran for the Democrats.

General election

Polling

Results

Auditor

Incumbent Republican State Auditor Dave Yost ran for re-election to a second term in office.

State Representative John Patrick Carney ran for the Democrats.

Libertarian Bob Bridges also ran.

General election

Polling

Results

State legislative branch

Ohio Senate

The 17 odd-numbered districts out of 33 seats in the Ohio Senate were up for election in 2014. Ten of these seats were held by Republicans and seven were held by Democrats. Republicans controlled the chamber with a 23 to 10 majority.

Ohio House of Representatives

All 99 seats in the Ohio House of Representatives were up for election in 2014. Republicans held 59 seats and Democrats held 40 seats.

Supreme Court of Ohio

While judicial races in Ohio are technically non-partisan (party affiliations are not listed on the ballot), candidates run in party primaries. Terms are six years, and justices may run for re-election an unlimited number of times before their 70th birthday. The Supreme Court currently consists of 6 Republicans and 1 Democrat.

Associate Justice (Term commencing 01/01/2015)
Incumbent Justice Sharon L. Kennedy (R) was eligible to run for another 6-year term.

Republican primary

Candidates
Sharon L. Kennedy, incumbent Associate Justice of the Supreme Court of Ohio

Results

Democratic primary

Candidates
Tom Letson, state representative

Results

General election

Polling

Results

Associate Justice (Term commencing 01/02/2015)
Incumbent Justice Judith L. French (R) was eligible to run for another 6-year term.

Republican primary

Candidates
Judith L. French, incumbent Associate Justice of the Supreme Court of Ohio

Results

Democratic primary

Candidates
John P. O'Donnell, Cuyahoga County Court of Common Pleas judge

Results

General election

Polling

Results

Ballot initiatives

May election

Issue One: to fund public infrastructure capital improvements by permitting the issuance of general obligation bonds.

November election
No initiatives qualified for the November 2014 ballot.

References

 
2014 elections in the United States by state